Carcharhiniformes , the ground sharks, are the largest order of sharks, with over 270 species. They include a number of common types, such as catsharks, swellsharks, and the sandbar shark.

Members of this order are characterized by the presence of a nictitating membrane over the eye, two dorsal fins, an anal fin, and five gill slits.

The families in the order Carcharhiniformes are expected to be revised; recent DNA studies show that some of the conventional groups are not monophyletic.

The oldest members of the order appeared during the Middle-Late Jurassic, which have teeth and bodyforms that are morphologically similar to living catsharks. Carchariniformes first underwent major diversification during the Late Cretaceous, initially as small-sized forms, before radiating into medium and large body sizes during the Cenozoic.

Families
According to FishBase, the nine families of ground sharks are:
 Carcharhinidae (requiem sharks)
 Galeocerdonidae (Tiger shark)
 Hemigaleidae (weasel sharks)
 Leptochariidae (barbeled houndshark)
 Proscylliidae (finback catsharks)
 Pseudotriakidae (false catsharks)
 Scyliorhinidae (catsharks)
 Sphyrnidae (hammerhead sharks)
 Triakidae (houndsharks)

Timeline of genera

References

Further references
 Froese, Rainer, and Daniel Pauly, eds. (2013) Fish Identification: Ground sharks in FishBase. March 2013 version.

External links
 Order Carcharhiniformes

 
Articles which contain graphical timelines
Cartilaginous fish orders
Taxa named by Leonard Compagno
Extant Albian first appearances